Elizabeth Dorothy Futas (May 8, 1944–February 6, 1995) was the head of the University of Rhode Island, Graduate School of Library and Information Science from 1986–1995. Earlier in her career, Dr. Futas worked as a cataloger for the Ford Foundation in New York and as a reference librarian at Queens College. She had also held faculty positions at Rutgers University-New Brunswick, Emory University and the University of Washington in Seattle, among other institutions. Her text on Collection Development is widely regarded.

Legacy
Futas is best known for her collections development polices and procedures. The American Library Association offers an annual award to librarians in Futas' name titled Futas Catalyst for Change Award.

Works
 Collection Development Policies and Procedures. (1995) Oryx Press, 
 Developing public library collections, policies, and procedures : a how-to-do-it manual for small and medium-sized public libraries. Neal-Shuman (1991) 
 Library Acquisition Policies and Procedures. (1984) Oryx Press, 
 The Library Forms Illustrated Handbook. (1984) Neal-Schuman, 
 Dissertation: Communication and information patterns in the emerging, interdisciplinary area of women's studies. Rutgers University (1980)

References

1944 births
1995 deaths
American librarians
American women librarians
Brooklyn College alumni
American women non-fiction writers
20th-century American women
20th-century American people
American Library Association awards